Children in Crisis was a non-profit organization aimed at improving the lives of children and women from underprivileged backgrounds in third-world countries. It was headquartered in London, England. On the 25th anniversary of Children in Crisis's foundation in 2018, it was merged with Street Child, an organisation run by Tom Dannatt in Bangladesh, Afghanistan and Sierra Leone.

Patronage
It was founded by Sarah, Duchess of York, who was life president. Her elder daughter, Princess Beatrice of York, served as Ambassador of Children in Crisis starting in 2007. Alongside Beatrice, her younger daughter, Princess Eugenie of York, attended the fundraising annual dinner in March 2011.

The vice-presidents were: Paul Szkiler, Grahame Harding, Olivier de Givenchy and Mark Olbrich.

The Board of Trustees comprised:
Alasdair Haynes (Chair).
Alexandra Buxton.
Ron Friend.
Deborah Helsby.
Frances Prenn.
Julia Streets.
Anthony Wallersteiner.
James Henderson.

Overview
In 2005, it worked with other partners in Afghanistan to provide education for children who had been unable to attend school. It also helped HIV/AIDS education in Sierra Leone and with schools in East Timor.

References

External links

Children's charities based in England
Non-profit organisations based in London